Telecommunications in Albania include radio, television, fixed and mobile telephones, and the Internet.

History
Until 1990, Albania was extremely isolated and controlled, and installation and maintenance of a modern system of international and domestic telecommunications was precluded. Callers previously needed operator assistance even to make domestic long-distance calls.

As of 1992, Albania's telephone density was the lowest in Europe, at 1.4 units for every 100 inhabitants. Tirana accounted for about 13,000 of the country's 42,000 direct lines; Durrës, the main port city, ranked second with 2,000 lines; the rest were concentrated in Shkodër, Elbasan, Vlorë, Gjirokastër, and other towns. At one time, each village had a telephone but during the land redistribution of the early 1990s peasants knocked out service to about 1,000 villages by removing telephone wire for fencing. As of 1992, most of Albania's telephones were obsolete, low-quality East European models, some dating from the 1940s; workers at a Tirana factory assembled a small number of telephones from Italian parts.

In the early 1990s, Albania had 240 microwave circuits carrying international calls to Italy and 180 to Greece. The Albanian telephone company had also installed two U-20 Italtel digital exchanges. The exchange in Tirana handled international, national, and local calls; the Durrës exchange handled only local calls. Two United States firms handled direct-dial calls from the United States to Tirana.

At present the land lines are overloaded, and it is difficult to receive a telephone number. As a result, the number of mobile phones has skyrocketed in the bigger cities.

Radio and television

 Radio stations:
 2 public radio networks and roughly 25 private radio stations; several international broadcasters are available (2010); 
 FM 56 (3 national, 53 local), shortwave 1 (2008).
 Radios: 1 million (2001).
 Television stations: 
 3 public TV networks, one of which transmits by satellite to Albanian-language communities in neighboring countries; more than 60 private TV stations; many viewers can pick up Italian and Greek TV broadcasts via terrestrial reception; cable TV service is available (2010);
 76 (3 national, 73 local); note - 3 cable networks (2008).
 Television sets: 1 million (2008).

The state broadcaster in Albania, Radio Televizioni Shqiptar (RTSh, Albanian Radio and TV), operates national radio and television networks. It has competition from scores of privately owned stations. According to a 2002 survey the broadcaster with the largest audience is TV Klan.

Television is the most influential medium. Many Albanian's watch Italian and Greek stations via terrestrial reception.

The BBC World Service (103.9 MHz in the capital, Tirana), Deutsche Welle, Radio France Internationale, and the Voice of America are available.

Telephones

 Calling code: +355
 International call prefixes: 069,068,067
 Main lines:
 312,000 lines in use (2012); 
 316,400 lines in use (2008).
 Mobile cellular: 
 3.5 million lines (2012);
 3.1 million lines (2008).
 Telephone system: Despite investment in fixed lines, the density of main lines remains the lowest in Europe with roughly ten fixed lines per 100 people; however, offsetting the shortage of fixed line capacity, mobile phone service has been available since 1996; cellular use is widespread and generally effective; multiple companies provide mobile services and mobile teledensity had reached 100 per 100 persons; international traffic is carried by fiber-optic cable and, when necessary, by microwave radio relay from the Tirana exchange to Italy and Greece (2011).
 Satellite earth stations: unknown.
 Communications cables: Submarine cables provide connectivity to Italy, Croatia, and Greece; the Trans-Balkan Line, a combination submarine and land fiber-optic system between Albania and Italy, provides additional connectivity to Bulgaria, North Macedonia, and Turkey (2011). Two other cable systems serving Albania are the ADRIA-1 (Croatia, Albania, Greece) and the Italy-Albania.

Internet

 Top-level domain: .al
 Internet users: 
 1.6 million users, 100th in the world; 54.7% of the population, 77th in the world (2012).
 1.3 million, 91st in the world (2009).
 Fixed broadband: 148,882 subscriptions, 91st in the world; 5.0% of population, 103rd in the world (2012).
 Wireless broadband: 552,676 subscriptions, 90th in the world; 18.4% of the population, 74th in the world (2012).
 Internet hosts: 15,528 hosts, 124th in the world (2012).
 IPv4: 323,840 addresses allocated, less than 0.05% of the world total, 3.4 addresses per 1000 people (2012).
 Internet service providers: 10 ISPs (2001). (2 with national coverage and 8 providers with domestic coverage)
Providers with national coverage:

Albtelecom

Vodafone Albania (Formerly ABCom)

Defunct providers:

One Telecommunications (Formerly Telekom Albania, AMC) used to offer fixed line services with national coverage

Internet broadband services were initiated in 2005, but growth has been slow. Internet cafes are popular in Tirana and have started to spread outside the capital.

Albtelecom has launched a free wifi network all over Albania and is available at public places, beaches and ancient sites.

Eutelsat satellite broadband is being used to provide free public Internet access in rural Albanian post offices, schools, and local government offices.

Internet censorship and surveillance
There are no government restrictions on access to the Internet or reports that the government monitors e-mail or Internet chat rooms without appropriate legal authority. The constitution provides for freedom of speech and press, and the government generally respects these rights in practice. However, there are reports that the government and businesses influence and pressure the media. The constitution and law prohibit arbitrary interference with privacy, family, home, or correspondence, and the government generally respects these prohibitions in practice.

See also

 BBC Albanian service
 Media of Albania
 Economy of Albania

References

  
  This article incorporates public domain material from publications of the International Telecommunication Union (ITU).

External links
 Authority of Electronic and Postal Communications (AKEP), 
 Projekt Strategjia e Republikës së Shqipërisë për kalimin nga transmetimet analoge në ato numerike  ("Draft Strategy of the Republic of Albania for the transition from analogue to digital broadcasting"), Këshilli Kombëtar i Radios dhe Televizionit (KKRT) (National Council of Radio and Television). English translation.